FOB Grizzly (formerly FOB Spartan, FOB Red Lion and FOB Barbarian) was a U.S. Army Forward Operating Base located within Camp Ashraf, Iraq.

The FOB was named after the callsign for the 49th Military Police Battalion.  They were in charge of the FOB from October 2005 until October 2006 and their call sign was "Grizzly" dubbed after the California Grizzly Bear on the State Flag, TASK FORCE 49, 49th Military Police Battalion and Forward Operating Base Commander, LTC Anthony Palumbo and CSM Paul George conducted operations with over 2,000 U.S. and Coalition and 300 Contract employees.

Units that have deployed to FOB Grizzly
2003-2004
Bravo Company, 3d Battalion, 67th Armored Regiment, 3d Armored Brigade Combat Team, 4th Infantry Division (FOB Barbarian)
Alpha Company, 3d Battalion, 67th Armored Regiment, 3d Armored Brigade Combat Team, 4th Infantry Division (FOB Gator)
324th Military Police Battalion (PA ARNG), 800 Military Police Brigade

2004-2005
530th Military Police Battalion 
336th Military Police Battalion
793rd Military Police Battalion

2005-2006
49th Military Police Battalion
4th MEB(AT)
HHB 1-102nd Field Artillery Forward
110th Military Police Company
Bravo Battery, 1st Battalion, 142nd Field Artillery
Alpha Company, 1st Battalion, 194th Armor
Alpha Troop, 1st Squadron, 124th Cavalry
Bravo Battery, 2nd Battalion, 123rd Field Artillery
Bulgarian 1st Guard Company
Bulgarian 2nd Guard Company
Muldovan EOD Team
25th ROC
Charlie Troop, 1st Squadron, 113th Cavalry
Delta Company, 32nd Signal Battalion
HHC, Signal, 1st Squadron, 32nd Cavalry

2006-2007
382nd Military Police Battalion
Bravo Company, Anti-Terrorism Battalion, 2nd Marine Division
Charlie Battery 1/213th ADA
Alpha Company, 1st Battalion 9th Marines, 2D MARDIV
2007-2008
504th Military Police Battalion
Alpha Company, 1st Battalion 9th Marines, 2D MARDIV
Bravo Company, Anti-Terrorism Battalion, 2D MARDIV
735th Combat Support Company
728th Military Police Battalion
US Marine Task Force National Capital Region
Alpha Battery, 1st Battalion, 161st Field Artillery
1161ST Forward Support Company (FSC)
Alpha Company, 63rd ESB
Bravo Troop, 1st Squadron, 102nd Cavalry
Delta Company, 250 BSB
324th Military Police Battalion
519th Military Police Battalion
424th Camp Liaison Detachment
540th Camp Liaison Detachment

2009
HHC, Alpha, Bravo and Charlie Companies,  1st Battalion, 24th Infantry Regiment
2009-2010

Charlie Company 1-128th IBCT, WIARNG
Hawkeye, Blackhawk, and Comanche Companies 1st Battalion 23rd Infantry Regiment
E co 536th FSB
 Charlie Battery 1st Battalion 37th Field Artillery Regiment (Rock Tac)

See also
 List of United States Military installations in Iraq

References

 

G
Military installations closed in the 2000s
Installations of the United States Marine Corps in Iraq